Colince Ngaha Poungoue (born 26 September 1981) is an amateur Ukrainian professional football striker of Cameroonian descent and manager. He became the first Afro-Ukrainian athlete who was appointed a head coach of professional club in Ukraine.

Career
In 2006–2008 Colince played for Moldovan club from town of Otaci over Dniester that lies near Ukrainian town of Mohyliv-Podilskyi also upon Dniester.

With Moldovan club Colince played at continental competitions, the 2007–08 UEFA Cup, against the Hungarian side Budapest Honvéd.

During the 2008 summer transfer season, he transferred to Zorya from Moldovan Premier League side Nistru Otaci. Due to an injury in 2008, Colince only played one game at the top league scoring his first and his last goal at the Ukrainian Premier League. Later he managed to recover and transferred to FC Stal Alchevsk in 2010. Until dissolution in 2015, he played at the Alchevsk club. After that moved back to Podillia (Vinnytsia).

In 2016 Ngaha has acted as a head coach after dismissal of Solovyanenko.

In 2019 he was already appointed as a full-pledged head coach of the club.

Personal life
Ngaha graduated Technical University in Vinnytsia. He is married with a Ukrainian woman and has two children Ivan and Christian. Ivan Ngaha actively trains at the Dynamo Kyiv Football School.

In August 2017 Colince Ngaha got a Ukrainian citizenship.

Ngaha also established own football school in Vinnytsia for children. He is a polyglot knowing English, French, Russian, and Ukrainian languages.

Ngaha has a great respect for former head coach of FC Stal Alchevsk Anatoliy Volobuyev.

References

External links 
 Official Website Profile
 Profile on Football Squads
 

1981 births
Living people
Cameroonian footballers
Cameroonian expatriate footballers
Cameroonian expatriate sportspeople in Moldova
Cameroonian expatriate sportspeople in Ukraine
FC Zorya Luhansk players
FC Stal Alchevsk players
Ukrainian Premier League players
Ukrainian First League players
Ukrainian Second League players
Expatriate footballers in Moldova
Expatriate footballers in Ukraine
Association football forwards
FC Krasyliv players
FC Nistru Otaci players
FC Kramatorsk players
FC Nyva Vinnytsia players
FC Vinnytsia players
FC Nyva Vinnytsia managers
Naturalized citizens of Ukraine
Ukrainian football managers